Gonzalo Esteban Álvarez Morales (born 20 January 1997), nicknamed El Gringo, is a Chilean professional footballer who plays as a winger for Chilean Primera División side Audax Italiano.

Career
He joined Unión San Felipe at U16 level, making his professional debut in a Primera B match against Naval on May 14, 2014.

On second half 2020 Chilean Primera División, he joined Audax Italiano on loan from Unión San Felipe with an option to buy, making his debut at the Chilean top flight scoring a goal against Coquimbo Unido.

Career statistics

Club

Notes

Personal life
Born in San Felipe, he moved to Miami along with his family at the age of 7, returning to Chile at the age of 13. Due to the fact that he lived in the United States, he has been nicknamed El Gringo.

References

External links

Living people
1997 births
People from San Felipe, Chile
Chilean footballers
Primera B de Chile players
Segunda División Profesional de Chile players
Chilean Primera División players
Unión San Felipe footballers
San Antonio Unido footballers
Audax Italiano footballers
Chilean expatriate footballers
Chilean expatriate sportspeople in the United States
Expatriate soccer players in the United States
Association football forwards
21st-century Chilean people